George Carlos Smith Jr. (23 August 1910 – 29 March 1987) was the eleventh general superintendent of the Young Men's Mutual Improvement Association (YMMIA) of the Church of Jesus Christ of Latter-day Saints (LDS Church) from 1962 to 1969.

Biography
Smith was born in Salt Lake City, Utah, to George Carlos and Lillian Emery Smith. He became the president of the LDS Church's Big Cottonwood Utah Stake in 1949. In 1956, he became the president of the Holladay Utah Stake. In 1958, Smith became the first assistant to Joseph T. Bentley, the general superintendent of the YMMIA. He was released in June 1961, but in October 1962 Smith was asked to succeed Bentley and become the YMMIA superintendent. During his tenure, Smith had three different assistants: Carl W. Buehner, George R. Hill, and future LDS Church apostle Marvin J. Ashton. In 1969 Smith was released; his successor was W. Jay Eldredge.

In 1969, Smith became the first president of the church's Southeast Asia Mission, which was headquartered in Singapore and had stewardship for Indonesia, India, and most of the countries in Southeast Asia.  This included supervising church members in South Vietnam.  Some of the church's servicemen who were in Vietnam were called to serve as part-time missionaries.  Both other American servicemen and native Vietnamese were baptized as a result of these efforts. Smith had previously presided over the Central States Mission of the church.

Smith married P. Lavon Petersen and was the father of five children. He was the grandson of LDS Church president Joseph F. Smith. He died in Salt Lake City at age 76.

References
Arnold K. Garr, Donald Q. Cannon & Richard O. Cowan (eds.) (2000). Encyclopedia of Latter-day Saint History (Salt Lake City, Utah: Deseret Book)
R. Lanier Britsch. "The Church in Asia." Encyclopedia of Mormonism (Daniel H. Ludlow ed.) (New York: Macmillan, 1992) 1:75–81

1910 births
1987 deaths
20th-century Mormon missionaries
American Mormon missionaries in India
American Mormon missionaries in the United States
American expatriates in Singapore
American leaders of the Church of Jesus Christ of Latter-day Saints
Counselors in the General Presidency of the Young Men (organization)
General Presidents of the Young Men (organization)
Latter Day Saints from Utah
Mission presidents (LDS Church)
Mormon missionaries in Indonesia
Mormon missionaries in Malaysia
Mormon missionaries in Singapore
Mormon missionaries in Vietnam
People from Salt Lake City